This is a list of the main career statistics of German professional tennis player, Angelique Kerber. To date, Kerber has won 14 career singles titles, including three Grand Slam singles titles at the 2016 Australian Open, 2016 US Open and 2018 Wimbledon Championships. She has also won titles on each playing surface (namely, hard, clay and grass). She was also the runner-up at the 2016 Wimbledon Championships and won Silver at the 2016 Rio Olympics. Kerber became the world No. 1 for the first time in her career on 12 September 2016.

Career achievements 
In 2010, Kerber made her first WTA final, at the Copa Colsanitas where she finished runner-up to Mariana Duque-Mariño. She also recorded the first top-50 finish of her career that year, at world No. 47. The following year, her breakthrough occurred at the US Open where, as the world No. 92, she soared to her first Grand Slam semifinal where she fell in three sets to the ninth seed and eventual champion Samantha Stosur. After the tournament, she rose into the world's top 40, and eventually finished the year ranked No. 32.

In February 2012, Kerber scored her maiden career title, at the Open GDF Suez before reaching her first Premier Mandatory semifinal in Indian Wells where she lost to eventual champion Victoria Azarenka. Her second career title came shortly later, in April, at the Danish Open where she beat former world No. 1, Caroline Wozniacki. She then achieved her career-best result at the French Open by making the quarterfinals, before posting a runner-up result in Eastbourne and a semifinal showing at Wimbledon where she lost to Agnieszka Radwańska. A few weeks later, Kerber progressed to the quarterfinals of the London Olympics, falling to Azarenka once more. before upsetting Serena Williams en route to her maiden Premier 5 final in Cincinnati. Kerber cracked the world's top 5 before the WTA Championships that year, and subsequently finished the year ranked world No. 5.

Between 2013 and 2014, won one title at the Linz Open in 2013, while making Premier 5 finals in Tokyo (2013) and Doha (2014), and advancing to her second quarterfinal at Wimbledon in 2014, where she lost to eventual runner-up Eugenie Bouchard. 2015 saw Kerber reverse her previous season's 0–4 record in singles finals by winning her first four finals in succession, which includes her maiden titles on clay and grass courts, at the Family Circle Cup and Aegon Classic, respectively. She also won her first title on home soil in 2015, doing so in Stuttgart where she beat Wozniacki in the final. Her other finals in 2015 came in Stanford and Hong Kong, the former being her fourth and final title win of the year.

In 2016, Kerber posted a runner-up finish in Brisbane International, and then lifting her maiden Grand Slm title at the Australian Open, where she overcame Serena Williams in the final in three sets. Kerber ascended to a new career-high ranking of world No. 2 as a result. In April, she defended a title for the first time by winning her second title of the year in Stuttgart. On grass, Kerber was a runner-up at the Wimbledon Championships. She then reached back-to-back finals at the Rio Olympics and the Cincinnati Open. At the US Open, Kerber avenged her defeat to Karolína Plíšková in Cincinnati by defeating the Czech in the final in three sets to win her second Grand Slam singles title. Kerber also became the world No. 1 for the first time in her career, after winning the US Open, and is the oldest player to ascend to the top ranking. She then finished runner-up to Dominika Cibulková at the WTA Finals and subsequently concluded the year as world No. 1.

In 2018, Kerber once again beat Serena Williams in a Grand Slam tournament final, this time at Wimbledon, a rematch of their final in 2016, to win her third Grand Slam title, leaving just the French Open as the Grand Slam tournament she has yet to win. Kerber would finish that year as world No. 2.

Performance timelines

Only results in WTA Tour (incl. Grand Slams) main-draw, Olympic Games and Fed Cup/Billie Jean King Cup are included in win–loss records.

Singles
Current through the 2022 WTA Tour.

{|class="wikitable nowrap" style=font-size:90%;text-align:center
|-
!Tournament
!2003
!2004
!2005
!2006
!2007
!2008
!2009
!2010
!2011
!2012
!2013
!2014
!2015
!2016
!2017
!2018
!2019
!2020
!2021
!2022
!2023
!SR 
!W–L 
!Win %
|-
| colspan="25" align="left" |Grand Slam tournaments
|-
|align=left| Australian Open
|A
|A
|A
|A
|bgcolor=ecf2ff|Q1
|bgcolor=afeeee|2R
|bgcolor=afeeee|1R
|bgcolor=afeeee|3R
|bgcolor=afeeee|1R
|bgcolor=afeeee|3R
|bgcolor=afeeee|4R
|bgcolor=afeeee|4R
|bgcolor=afeeee|1R
|bgcolor=lime|W
|bgcolor=afeeee|4R
|bgcolor=yellow|SF
|bgcolor=afeeee|4R
|bgcolor=afeeee|4R
|bgcolor=afeeee|1R
|bgcolor=afeeee|1R
|A
|1 / 15
|32–14
|
|-
|align=left| French Open
|A
|A
|A
|A
|bgcolor=afeeee|1R
|bgcolor=afeeee|1R
|bgcolor=ecf2ff|Q2
|bgcolor=afeeee|2R
|bgcolor=afeeee|1R
|bgcolor=ffebcd|QF
|bgcolor=afeeee|4R
|bgcolor=afeeee|4R
|bgcolor=afeeee|3R
|bgcolor=afeeee|1R
|bgcolor=afeeee|1R
|bgcolor=ffebcd|QF
|bgcolor=afeeee|1R
|bgcolor=afeeee|1R
|bgcolor=afeeee|1R
|bgcolor=afeeee|3R
|
|0 / 15
|19–15
|
|-
|align=left| Wimbledon
|A
|A
|A
|A
|bgcolor=afeeee|1R
|bgcolor=afeeee|1R
|bgcolor=ecf2ff|Q2
|bgcolor=afeeee|3R
|bgcolor=afeeee|1R
|bgcolor=yellow|SF
|bgcolor=afeeee|2R
|bgcolor=ffebcd|QF
|bgcolor=afeeee|3R
|bgcolor=thistle|F
|bgcolor=afeeee|4R
|bgcolor=lime|W
|bgcolor=afeeee|2R
|style=color:#767676|NH
|bgcolor=yellow|SF
|bgcolor=afeeee|3R
|
|1 / 14
|38–13
|
|-
|align=left| US Open
|A
|A
|A
|A
|bgcolor=afeeee|1R
|bgcolor=ecf2ff|Q1
|bgcolor=afeeee|2R
|bgcolor=afeeee|1R
|bgcolor=yellow|SF
|bgcolor=afeeee|4R
|bgcolor=afeeee|4R
|bgcolor=afeeee|3R
|bgcolor=afeeee|3R
|bgcolor=lime|W
|bgcolor=afeeee|1R
|bgcolor=afeeee|3R
|bgcolor=afeeee|1R
|bgcolor=afeeee|4R
|bgcolor=afeeee|4R
|A
|
|1 / 14
|31–13
|
|-style=font-weight:bold;background:#efefef
|style=text-align:left|Win–loss
|0–0
|0–0
|0–0
|0–0
|0–3
|1–3
|1–2
|5–4
|5–4
|15–4
|10–4
|12–4
|6–4
|20–2
|6–4
|18–3
|4–4
|6–3
|8–4
|4–3
|0–0
|3 / 58
|120–55
|
|-
| colspan="25" align="left" |Year-end championships
|-
|align=left|WTA Finals
|colspan=9|DNQ
|bgcolor=afeeee|RR
|bgcolor=afeeee|RR
|Alt
|bgcolor=afeeee|RR
|bgcolor=thistle|F
|DNQ
|bgcolor=afeeee|RR
|DNQ
|style=color:#767676|NH
|colspan=2|DNQ
|
|0 / 5
|7–10
|41%
|-
| colspan="25" align="left" |National representation
|-
|align=left|Summer Olympics
|style=color:#767676|NH
|A
|colspan=3 style=color:#767676|NH
|A
|colspan=3 style=color:#767676|NH
|bgcolor=ffebcd|QF
|colspan=3 style=color:#767676|NH
|bgcolor=silver|F-S
|colspan=4 style=color:#767676|NH
|A
|colspan=2 style=color:#767676|NH
|0 / 2
|8–2
|80%
|-
|align=left|Billie Jean King Cup
|A
|A
|A
|A
|bgcolor=ecf2ff|PO
|bgcolor=ecf2ff|PO
|A
|A
|A
|bgcolor=afeeee|1R
|bgcolor=ecf2ff|PO
|bgcolor=thistle|F
|bgcolor=yellow|SF
|bgcolor=afeeee|1R
|bgcolor=ecf2ff|PO
|bgcolor=yellow|SF
|A
|A
|bgcolor=afeeee|RR
|bgcolor=ecf2ff|QR
|
|0 / 6
|14–15
|48%
|-
| colspan="25" align="left" |WTA 1000 + former Tier I tournaments
|-
|align=left|Dubai / Qatar Open
|colspan=5 style=color:#767676|NMS
|bgcolor=afeeee|1R
|A
|A
|bgcolor=afeeee|1R
|bgcolor=afeeee|2R
|bgcolor=afeeee|2R
|bgcolor=thistle|F
|bgcolor=afeeee|3R
|bgcolor=afeeee|2R
|bgcolor=yellow|SF
|bgcolor=ffebcd|QF
|bgcolor=afeeee|3R
|A
|bgcolor=afeeee|1R
|bgcolor=afeeee|1R
|A
|0 / 12
|12–12
|50%
|-
|align=left|Indian Wells Open
|A
|A
|A
|A
|A
|bgcolor=afeeee|3R
|bgcolor=ecf2ff|Q1
|A
|bgcolor=afeeee|1R
|bgcolor=yellow|SF
|bgcolor=yellow|SF
|bgcolor=afeeee|2R
|bgcolor=afeeee|2R
|bgcolor=afeeee|2R
|bgcolor=afeeee|4R
|bgcolor=ffebcd|QF
|bgcolor=thistle|F
|style=color:#767676|NH
|bgcolor=ffebcd|QF
|bgcolor=afeeee|4R
|A
|0 / 12
|23–12
|66%
|-
|align=left|Miami Open
|A
|A
|A
|A
|A
|bgcolor=afeeee|2R
|A
|bgcolor=ecf2ff|Q2
|bgcolor=afeeee|2R
|bgcolor=afeeee|2R
|bgcolor=afeeee|3R
|bgcolor=ffebcd|QF
|bgcolor=afeeee|3R
|bgcolor=yellow|SF
|bgcolor=ffebcd|QF
|bgcolor=ffebcd|QF
|bgcolor=afeeee|3R
|style=color:#767676|NH
|bgcolor=afeeee|3R
|bgcolor=afeeee|2R
|A
|0 / 12
|19–12
|61%
|-
|align=left|Madrid Open
|colspan=6 style=color:#767676|NH
|A
|A
|A
|bgcolor=afeeee|3R
|bgcolor=ffebcd|QF
|bgcolor=afeeee|1R
|bgcolor=afeeee|1R
|bgcolor=afeeee|1R
|bgcolor=afeeee|3R
|A
|bgcolor=afeeee|2R
|style=color:#767676|NH
|bgcolor=afeeee|2R
|A
|
|0 / 8
|9–7
|56%
|-
|align=left|Italian Open
|A
|A
|A
|A
|A
|A
|A
|A
|bgcolor=afeeee|1R
|bgcolor=yellow|SF
|A
|bgcolor=afeeee|2R
|bgcolor=afeeee|2R
|bgcolor=afeeee|2R
|bgcolor=afeeee|2R
|bgcolor=ffebcd|QF
|A
|bgcolor=afeeee|1R
|bgcolor=afeeee|3R
|bgcolor=afeeee|1R
|
|0 / 10
|10–10
|50%
|-
|align=left|Canadian Open
|A
|A
|A
|A
|bgcolor=ecf2ff|Q1
|A
|A
|bgcolor=afeeee|1R
|A
|bgcolor=afeeee|3R
|bgcolor=afeeee|2R
|bgcolor=afeeee|3R
|bgcolor=afeeee|3R
|bgcolor=yellow|SF
|bgcolor=afeeee|3R
|bgcolor=afeeee|2R
|bgcolor=afeeee|1R
|style=color:#767676|NH
|A
|A
|
|0 / 9
|8–9
|47%
|-
|align=left|Cincinnati Open
|colspan=6 style=color:#767676|NMS
|A
|A
|A
|bgcolor=thistle|F
|bgcolor=afeeee|3R
|bgcolor=afeeee|3R
|bgcolor=afeeee|1R
|bgcolor=thistle|F
|bgcolor=afeeee|2R
|bgcolor=afeeee|3R
|bgcolor=afeeee|1R
|A
|bgcolor=yellow|SF
|A
|
|0 / 9
|16–9
|60%
|-
|align=left|Pan Pac. / Wuhan Open
|A
|A
|A
|A
|A
|A
|A
|bgcolor=afeeee|1R
|bgcolor=afeeee|2R
|bgcolor=yellow|SF
|bgcolor=thistle|F
|bgcolor=ffebcd|QF
|bgcolor=yellow|SF
|bgcolor=afeeee|3R
|bgcolor=afeeee|1R
|bgcolor=afeeee|3R
|bgcolor=afeeee|1R
|colspan=3 style=color:#767676|NH
|
|0 / 10
|14–10
|58%
|-
|align=left|China Open
|colspan=6 style=color:#767676|NMS
|A
|bgcolor=afeeee|3R
|bgcolor=ecf2ff|Q2
|bgcolor=ffebcd|QF
|bgcolor=ffebcd|QF
|bgcolor=afeeee|3R
|bgcolor=ffebcd|QF
|bgcolor=afeeee|3R
|bgcolor=afeeee|2R
|bgcolor=afeeee|3R
|bgcolor=afeeee|2R
|colspan=3 style=color:#767676|NH
|
|0 / 9
|16–9
|64%
|-
|align=left|German Open
|bgcolor=ecf2ff|Q2
|bgcolor=ecf2ff|Q1
|bgcolor=ecf2ff|Q2
|A
|A
|bgcolor=afeeee|1R
|colspan=15 style=color:#767676|NMS / NH
|0 / 1
|0–1
|0%
|-
|align=left|Southern California Open
|style=color:#767676|NMS
|A
|A
|A
|bgcolor=afeeee|2R
|colspan=16 style=color:#767676|NMS / NH
|0 / 1
|1–1
|50%
|-
|align=left|Zurich Open
|A
|A
|A
|A
|bgcolor=ecf2ff|Q1
|colspan=16 style=color:#767676|NMS / NH
|0 / 0
|0–0
|–
|-style=font-weight:bold;background:#efefef
|style=text-align:left|Win–loss
|0–0
|0–0
|0–0
|0–0
|1–1
|3–4
|0–0
|2–3
|2–5
|19–9
|15–8
|14–9
|10–9
|13–9
|12–9
|15–8
|9–7
|0–1
|11–6
|2–4
|0–0
|0 / 93
|128–92
|
|-
| colspan="25" align="left" |Career statistics
|-style=background:#efefef;font-weight:bold
|||2003||2004||2005||2006||2007||2008||2009||2010||2011||2012||2013||2014||2015||2016||2017||2018||2019||2020||2021||2022||2023||SR||W–L||Win%
|-bgcolor=efefef
|align=left|Tournaments
|0
|0
|0
|1
|10
|14
|6
|19
|20
|21
|22
|22
|25
|22
|22
|18
|20
|6
|16
|10
|0
|colspan=3|Career total: 274
|-style=font-weight:bold;background:#efefef
|style=text-align:left|Titles
|0
|0
|0
|0
|0
|0
|0
|0
|0
|2
|1
|0
|4
|3
|0
|2
|0
|0
|1
|1
|0
|colspan=3|Career total: 14
|-style=font-weight:bold;background:#efefef
|style=text-align:left|Finals
|0
|0
|0
|0
|0
|0
|0
|1
|0
|4
|3
|4
|5
|8
|1
|2
|2
|0
|1
|1
|0
|colspan=3|Career total: 32
|-bgcolor=efefef
|align=left|Hard win–loss
|0–0
|0–0
|0–0
|1–1
|2–5
|5–7
|2–4
|9–8
|16–13
|35–14
|34–17
|34–17
|29–18
|45–12
|21–17
|28–12
|19–14
|7–4
|15–10
|2–4
|0–0
|7 / 174
|304–177
|
|-bgcolor=efefef
|align=left|Clay win–loss
|0–0
|0–0
|0–0
|0–0
|0–1
|0–5
|1–2
|10–8
|1–6
|13–5
|9–4
|5–5
|17–3
|10–4
|3–5
|8–5
|2–2
|0–2
|4–4
|7–5
|0–0
|4 / 65
|90–66
|
|-bgcolor=efefef
|align=left|Grass win–loss
|0–0
|0–0
|0–0
|0–0
|4–3
|2–3
|0–0
|4–3
|0–1
|12–3
|2–2
|8–2
|7–1
|8–2
|5–2
|10–2
|7–3
|0–0
|11–2
|4–2
|0–0
|3 / 34
|84–31
|
|-bgcolor=efefef
|align=left|Carpet win–loss
|0–0
|0–0
|0–0
|0–0
|0–3
|0–0
|colspan=15 style=color:#767676|discontinued
|0 / 1
|0–3
|0%
|-style=font-weight:bold;background:#efefef
|style=text-align:left|Overall win–loss
|0–0
|0–0
|0–0
|1–1
|6–12
|7–15
|3–6
|23–19
|17–20
|60–22
|45–23
|47–24
|53–22
|63–18
|29–24
|46–19
|28–19
|7–6
|30–16
|13–11
|0–0
|14 / 274
|478–277
|
|-style=background:#efefef;font-weight:bold
|style=text-align:left|Win %
|–
|–
|–
|50%
|33%
|32%
|33%
|55%
|46%
|73%
|66%
|66%
|71%
|78%
|55%
|71%
|60%
|54%
|65%
|54%
|–
|colspan=3|Career total: 
|-bgcolor=efefef
|align=left|Year-end ranking
|433
|375
|261
|214
|84
|108
|106
|47
|32
|bgcolor=eee8aa|5
|bgcolor=eee8aa|9
|bgcolor=eee8aa|10
|bgcolor=eee8aa|10
|bgcolor=lime|1
|21
|bgcolor=thistle|2
|20
|25
|16
|103
|
|colspan=3|{{Tooltip|$31,886,468|Career prize money – singles and doubles combined}}
|}

Doubles

Grand Slam tournament finals

Singles: 4 (3 titles, 1 runner-up) 

Other significant finals

WTA Tour Championships

Singles: 1 (runner-up)

Olympic finals

Singles: 1 (silver medal) 

Premier Mandatory & Premier 5 finals

Singles: 5 (5 runner-ups)

WTA career finals

Singles: 32 (14 titles, 18 runner-ups)

Doubles: 2 (2 runner-ups)

Team competition finals

ITF Circuit finals
Since Kerber's professional debut in 2003, she has won eleven ITF titles in singles. She also reached five ITF doubles finals, winning three titles.

Singles: 18 (11 titles, 7 runner-ups)

Doubles: 5 (3 titles, 2 runner-ups)

ITF Junior Circuit finals

Singles: 4 (4 runner-ups)

Doubles: 2 (2 titles)

WTA Tour career earnings

 as of 28 June 2021

Career Grand Slam statistics

Career Grand Slam seedings
The tournaments won by Kerber are in boldface, and advanced into finals by Kerber are in italics.

Best Grand Slam results details

Head-to-head records

Record against top 10 players

Kerber's record against players who have been ranked in the top 10, with those who are active in boldface.

Record against No. 11–20 players
Kerber's record against players who have been ranked world No. 11–20, with those who are active in boldface.

 Sabine Lisicki 
 Kirsten Flipkens 
 Mirjana Lučić-Baroni 
 Karolína Muchová 
 Alisa Kleybanova 
 Ana Konjuh 
 Magda Linette 
 Donna Vekić 
 Beatriz Haddad Maia 
 Shahar Pe'er 
 Virginie Razzano 
 Wang Qiang 
 Markéta Vondroušová 
 Barbora Strýcová 
 Klára Koukalová 
 Daria Saville 
 Elena Vesnina 
 Peng Shuai 
 Yanina Wickmayer 
 Alison Riske-Amritraj 
 Alizé Cornet 
 Varvara Lepchenko 
 Tamarine Tanasugarn 
 Anastasia Pavlyuchenkova 
 Kaia Kanepi 
 Eleni Daniilidou 
 Petra Martić 
 Aravane Rezaï 
 Jennifer Brady 
 Nathalie Dechy 
 Leylah Fernandez 
 Magdaléna Rybáriková 
 Karolina Šprem 
 Zheng Jie 
 María José Martínez 
 Elise Mertens' * Statistics correct .No. 1 wins

Wins over top-10 players
Kerber has a  record against players who were, at the time the match was played, ranked in the top 10.

Double bagel matches (6–0, 6–0)

 Billie Jean King Cup performance Note: All matches were singles. Levels of Fed Cup in which Germany did not compete in a particular year are marked "NP".''

Notes

References

External links 
 
 
 
 Official website

Kerber, Angelique
Career